Linda Ferri (born 1957 in Rome) is an Italian author and screenwriter.

Early life 
Linda Ferri was born in Rome to an American mother and Italian father. However, she spent most of her early years in Paris, France. Ferri graduated with a degree in political science, in Paris. Subsequently, she studied Philosophy at Columbia University in New York. She later graduated with a degree in philosophy of history in Florence, Italy. Ferri worked numerous years in the writing industry, publishing work as a translator and editor of foreign literature.

In an interview with Biblioteche di Roma, in 2012, Ferri states that even though she has had a permanent and life-long love for literature, it was truly cinema that provided her most vivid and lasting memories of her childhood. She suggested that she could remember films better than books because she associated them with exciting family memories. In 2009, during an interview for the Italian edition of Marie Claire magazine, conducted by Lorenzo Pesce. Ferri states: "Perhaps being a woman helps me delve into the motions, or perhaps not. I do not believe in a 'feminine writing', a film script involves a multiplicity of gazes, it does not have a gender."

Career

Cinema 
Ferri is an author, who is perhaps best known for her work as a screenwriter. Following her first publication, she co-wrote the screenplay Voglia una donnaaa! in 1998, which was directed and co-written by two brothers, Marco and Luca Mazzieri. Subsequently, Ferri co-wrote the story and screenplay for La stanza del figlio (The Son’s Room) directed by Nanni Moretti in 2001. Additionally, in 2001, she co-wrote Luce dei mei Occhi (Light of my eyes) and La Vita che Vorrei (The Life I Want) directed by Giuseppe Piccioni in 2004. Ferri co-wrote Anche Libero Va Bene (Along the Ridge) in 2006, directed by Kim Rossi Stuart.

Novels 
Her first novel, entitled Incantesimi (Enchantments), consists of an assortment of 25 short stories and numerous books for children. Incantesimi is a fable-like biography with autobiographical roots. The book resembles a memoir from the age of a toddler to early teen years. Ferri’s second book, Il Tempo Che Resta (The Time That Remains) is an assortment of seven short stories that depicts the theme of love. Additionally, Ferri’s adult novel, Cecilia is a feminist reinterpretation of the myth of Saint Cecilia. It was born from what Ferri describes it as “falling in love” stemming from emotions aroused by the baroque artist Stefano Maderno’s statue of Saint Cecilia in the Church of Saint-Cecilia.

Filmography 
 1998: Voglio una donnaaa! directed by Luca Mazzieri, Marco Mazzieri
 2001: La stanza del figlio (The Son’s Room) directed by Nanni Moretti
 2001: Luce dei mei occhi (Light of my Eyes) directed by Giuseppe Piccioni
 2004: La vita che Vorrei (The Life I Want) directed by Giuseppe Piccioni
 2006: Anche libero va bene (Along the Ridge) directed by Kim Rossi Stuart
 2009: Di me cosa ne sai directed by Valerio Jalongo
 2010: Come un soffio directed by Michela Cescon
 2012: My bow breathing directed by Enrico Maria Artale

Awards

References 

Living people
1957 births
Italian women writers
Italian screenwriters
Writers from Rome